The fotmal ( "foot-measure"), also known as the foot, formel, fontinel, and fotmell, was an English unit of variable weight particularly used in measuring production, sales, and duties of lead.

Under the  Assize of Weights and Measures, it was equal to 70 Merchants' pounds and made up  of a load of lead. Elsewhere, it was made of 70 avoirdupois pounds and made up  load. According to Kiernan, in 16th-century Derbyshire, the fotmal was divided into "boles" and made up  of a fother, meaning it was considered to be 84 avoirdupois pounds.

It continued to be used until the 16th century.

References

Citations

Bibliography
 

Obsolete units of measurement
Units of mass